Yenepoya Institute of Technology (YIT) is an engineering institute, located at Moodabidri, hovering around 33 km from  Mangalore, Karnataka, India. The college was established in the year 2008. The college is affiliated to Visvesvaraya Technological University, Belgaum. It is also recognized by government of Karnataka and is approved by AICTE , New Delhi.

References

Universities and colleges in Dakshina Kannada district
Engineering colleges in Karnataka